Ivan Gajić (born 17 May 1979) is a Serbian former handball player.

Club career
Over the course of his career that lasted for two decades, Gajić played for Železničar Niš (1997–2005 and 2006), TSV Hannover-Burgdorf (2005–2006), Frisch Auf Göppingen (December 2006), ORK Niš (2007), Bjerringbro-Silkeborg (2007–2008), Gorenje Velenje (2008–2013), Tremblay (2013–2014), Al Ahli Doha (2014), and Celje (2015–2017).

International career
At international level, Gajić represented Serbia at the 2013 World Championship. He was previously capped for Serbia and Montenegro.

Honours
Gorenje Velenje
 Slovenian First League: 2008–09, 2011–12, 2012–13
Celje
 Slovenian First League: 2015–16, 2016–17
 Slovenian Cup: 2015–16, 2016–17

References

External links
 

1979 births
Living people
Sportspeople from Niš
Serbia and Montenegro male handball players
Serbian male handball players
Frisch Auf Göppingen players
Handball-Bundesliga players
Expatriate handball players
Serbia and Montenegro expatriate sportspeople in Germany
Serbian expatriate sportspeople in Germany
Serbian expatriate sportspeople in Denmark
Serbian expatriate sportspeople in Slovenia
Serbian expatriate sportspeople in France
Serbian expatriate sportspeople in Qatar